Confetti is the third studio album by Australian indie rock band Little Birdy, released on 8 May 2009. It debuted at number 6 on the ARIA album charts.

Background
In an interview, Steele describes the inspiration behind the title: "Confetti fell out of my mouth, the word just literally came out of nowhere".

"Brother" is inspired by a lifetime with her brother, Luke and father, Rick. It opens with the couplet "my brother you taught me how to fly, my papa you taught me how to cry".

Australian music legend Paul Kelly adds vocals and harmonica to the track, returning the favour for the backing vocals Katy provided on some sessions for him a few years back.

Track listing

Charts

End of year charts

Certifications

Release history

Personnel

Musicians

Little Birdy
 Katy Steele - vocals, guitar, keyboard
 Simon Leach - guitar, synthesiser, steel guitar
 Scott 'Barney' O'Donoghue - bass guitar, vocals, melodica, harmonica
 Matt Chequer - drums, percussion

Additional musicians
 Paul Coyle - trumpet (track 2)
 Shannon Barnett - trombone (track 2)
 Tom Spender - tenor saxophone (track 2)
 Peter Mitchell - baritone saxophone (track 2)
 Jessica Bell - violin (track 4, 5 and 10)
 Willow Stahlut - violin (track 4, 5 and 10)
 Ewen Bramble - cello (track 4, 5 and 10)
 Christian Read - viola (track 4, 5 and 10)
 Garret Costigan - pedal steel guitar (track 4)
 Miles Brown - theremin (tracks 3 and 10)
 Craig Shanahan - percussion (track 10)
 Charlie Thorpe - vocals (track 6)
 Josie De Sousa-Ray - vocals (track 6)
 Paul Kelly - vocals, harmonica (track 1)
 Fergus Deasy - guitar (track 1)

Credits
 Production - Little Birdy, Matt Chequer, Steve Schram
 Recording and Mixing - Steve Schram
 Recording Assistant - Alex Beck
 Mixing Assistants - Lachlan Wooden, Mick Rafferty, Davin Pidoto, Jim White
 Mastered - Bob Ludwig
 Artwork - Simon Leach
 Photography - Tony Mott, Louise Griew
 Cover - Simon Ozolins

References 

2009 albums
ARIA Award-winning albums
Eleven: A Music Company albums
Little Birdy albums